Susan Grant is a United States Air Force veteran, pilot, and bestselling American writer who has won numerous awards, including the Romance Writers of America RITA Award.

Biography

Grant was born in New York. She graduated from the United States Air Force Academy in 1982, the third class to include women, and was commissioned as an officer in the United States Air Force. She attended pilot training at Laughlin Air Force Base, Texas and stayed on for three more years as a flight instructor pilot in the T-37. Her next assignment was to Mather Air Force Base, California, flying T-43s as a command pilot. Upon her honorable discharge from the Air Force in 1989, she went on to work for United Airlines as a pilot, flying Boeing 737s, Boeing 747s, and Boeing 777s (current position).

She began writing in 1997 and is now the author of many award-winning, best-selling novellas and novels, including Contact, which won the 2003 Romance Writers of America RITA Award. She lives in Auburn, California.

Bibliography

Star series
 Star Raider (previous title The Star Queen) (prequel, novella)
 Star King (RITA finalist)
 Star Prince
 Star Princess (previous title Star Rogue)
 Star Champion (previous title The Champion of Barésh) (RITA finalist)
 Star Heroes (contains the novellas Star Puppy and Star Hero)

2176 Freedom series
 The Legend of Banzai Maguire
 The Scarlet Empress

Otherworldly Men series
 Guardian Alien (previous title Your Planet or Mine?) 
 Royally Mated (previous titles My Favorite Earthling and Royal Recruit)
 Cyborg and the Single Mom (previous title How to Lose an Extraterrestrial in 10 Days)

Borderlands series
 Warleader (previous title Moonstruck) (RITA finalist)
 Hunting the Warlord’s Daughter (previous title The Warlord's Daughter)
 Raider Born (previous title Sureblood’')

Sky Mates series
 Hawk FalconThe Lost Colony series
 The Last WarriorStand-alone novels
 Contact (RITA winner)
 Once a Pirate The Day Her Heart Stood Still (novella)

Anthologies
 Mission: Christmas (featuring the novella “Snowbound With a Prince”)
 Mysteria (featuring the novella “Mortal in Mysteria”)
 Mysteria Lane (featuring the novella “The Nanny From Hell”)
 Mysteria Nights'’ (bundle of Mysteria and Mysteria Lane anthologies)

References

External links
Susan Grant's Web page
Susan Grant’s Books

Living people
United Airlines people
20th-century American novelists
American romantic fiction writers
United States Air Force Academy alumni
Female officers of the United States Air Force
RITA Award winners
1960 births
21st-century American novelists
American women novelists
20th-century American women writers
Women romantic fiction writers
21st-century American women writers
American women aviators